Kampong Ubi Single Member Constituency was a constituency in Singapore. It existed from 1968 to 1988 and was merged in 1988 to Aljunied Group Representation Constituency. It carved out of Geylang Serai Constituency.

Member of Parliament

Elections

Elections in 1960s

References 

Singaporean electoral divisions